Vitaliano I Borromeo (died 1449) was an Italian Ghibelline nobleman from Milan, first Count of Arona. His father was Giacomo Vitaliani, ambassador of Padua to Venice, and his mother Margherita was of the prosperous family of Borromeo.  He married Ambrosina Fagnani, and his only son was Filippo Borromeo.  Many of his descendants took his name.

The events of Vitaliano Borromeo's youth and earlier life are unknown. According to one story, as a young man he was running out of money, and sold all his possessions to buy donkeys with covers embroidered with a camel sitting atop a basket, symbolizing his poverty. His rich but stingy uncle, Giovanni Borromeo, had previously denied his requests for money, but was so amused by this act designed to impress him that he allowed Vitaliano to enter his house.

Vitaliano was given citizenship of Milan in 1416, and rose in wealth and prestige. He bought much property, and served as treasurer in 1418. At some point he began a banking service that, under his son Filippo, would rise into prominence in all the major markets of Europe. He came into his inheritance in November 1431 when his uncle Giovanni Borromeo died, and he adopted his last name. In 1439 Filippo Maria Visconti awarded him the city of Arona on the western shore of Lake Maggiore, and six years later the Duke made him Count of Arona. In 1441 he was made a Milanese counselor. In 1447 he was elected a Captain and Defender of the Liberty of Milan at the first elections of the Ambrosian Republic.

As a staunch Ghibelline, he hosted a conspiracy in February 1449 against the dictator Carlo Gonzaga, led by his friends Giorgio Lampugnano and Teodoro Bossi. The conspiracy was discovered, and while Lampugnano and Cotti were killed, Borromeo fled to Arona.  While in Arona over the summer, he managed to purchase Angera from the Visconti for 12,800 Imperial lire, giving him mastery of all Lake Maggiore.  He died that October by an unknown cause and was buried in Milan. His son Filippo was given his inheritance by Francesco Sforza, who also, according to legend, added three rings to the Borromeo-family coat-of-arms.

Notes

References
 Borromei family
 Cromwell, Peter (2007), Borromean rings: Family Crest 
 
 Borromeo Turismo. History of the Rocca Borromeo 
 Ady, Cecilia M. and Edward Armstrong; Methuen & Co., 1907. A History of Milan under the Sforza. 

Businesspeople from Milan
1449 deaths
Vitaliano
People from the Province of Novara
Italian bankers
Year of birth unknown
15th-century Italian businesspeople
Nobility from Milan